Kondeskuh (also Romanized as Kondeskūh; also known as Kondeskū, Kondeskūh, and Kondeshkūh) is a village in Nilkuh Rural District in the Central District of Galikash County, Golestan Province, Iran. At the 2006 census, its population was 220, in 57 families.

References 

Populated places in Galikash County